Viljo is an Estonian and Finnish masculine given name and may refer to:

Viljo Halme (1907–1981), Finnish footballer
Viljo Heino (1914–1998), Finnish track and field athlete and 1948 Olympic competitor
Viljo Kajava (1909–1998), Finnish poet and writer
Viljo Nousiainen (1944–1999), Swedish athletics coach
Viljo Revell (1910–1964), Finnish architect
Viljo Rosvall (1898–1929), Finnish-born Canadian unionist
Viljo Tuompo (1893–1957), Finnish military Major General and Lieutenant General
Viljo Vellonen (1920–1995), Finnish cross country skier
Viljo Vesterinen (1907–1961), Finnish accordionist and composer

References

Masculine given names
Estonian masculine given names
Finnish masculine given names